Mariam Battistelli is an Italian soprano. Battistelli was born in Ethiopia.
She graduated at the Conservatory Lucio Campiani in Mantua and afterwards she has been admitted to the Centre de Perfeccionament Plácido Domingo at the Palau de les Arts Reina Sofía in Valencia.
In 2018 she joined the Ensemble of the Vienna State Opera where she remained until 2020.

Her breakthrough role was Il Paggio in Rigoletto. In 2021 she sang the lead role of Norina in Don Pasquale for the Glyndebourne Tour.

She has also sung Musetta in La bohème, at Toulon and Glyndebourne.

Other roles have included Gretel (2018, Vienna State Opera) and Frasquita (2021, Teatro di San Carlo, Naples).

References

Year of birth missing (living people)
Living people
Italian operatic sopranos